The 2014 Northern Iowa Panthers football team represented the University of Northern Iowa in the 2014 NCAA Division I FCS football season. The team was coached by Mark Farley and played their home games in the UNI-Dome. They were a member of the Missouri Valley Football Conference. They finished the season 9–5, 6–2 in MVFC play to finish in third place. They received an at-large bid to the FCS Playoffs where they defeated Stephen F. Austin in the first round before losing in the second round to Illinois State.

Personnel

Roster
2014 Roster

Coaching staff

Season

Schedule

 Source: Schedule

Media
The Panther Sports Network broadcast all home games live on television, marking the first time UNI had all home games on television. PSN affiliates for the 2014 season are:
CFU Channel 15
KCRG-TV Local 9.2 (Cedar Rapids)
WOI-DT Channel 5 D-2 (Ames/Des Moines)
KCAU-TV Channel 9 D-2 (Sioux City)
KGCW Channel 26 (Davenport)

The flagship radio station is 1540 AM KXEL in Waterloo, broadcasting all home and away games on an 11-station network.

Ranking movements

References

Northern Iowa
Northern Iowa Panthers football seasons
Northern Iowa
Northern Iowa Panthers football